HM Prison Wandsworth is a Category B men's prison at Wandsworth in the London Borough of Wandsworth, South West London, England. It is operated by His Majesty's Prison Service and is one of the largest prisons in the UK.

History

The prison was built in 1851, when it was known as Surrey House of Correction. It was designed according to the humane separate system principle: a number of corridors radiate from a central control point with each prisoner having toilet facilities. The toilets were subsequently removed to increase prison capacity and the prisoners had to engage in the process of "slopping out", until 1996.

On 29 July 1879, Catherine Webster was executed for the murder and dismemberment of her mistress, Mrs. Thomas, at Richmond. The murder, which occurred in March, was for the purpose of stealing Mrs. Thomas‘ property and going to America with a man named Webb. The only witnesses to the execution were the sheriff, the surgeon and the chaplain. No reporters were permitted. The sheriff reported that Mrs. Webster met her death with dignity. The body was buried in a shallow grave on prison grounds and covered in lime.

In 1930, inmate James Edward Spiers, serving a 10-year sentence for armed robbery, took his own life in front of a group of Justices of the Peace who were there to witness his receiving 15 lashes, then a form of judicial corporal punishment.

In 1951, Wandsworth was the holding prison for a national stock of the birch and the cat o' nine tails, implements for corporal punishment inflicted as a disciplinary penalty under the prison rules. An example of a flogging with the "cat" carried out in Wandsworth Prison itself was reported in July 1954.

On 8 July 1965, Ronnie Biggs escaped from the prison, where he was serving a 30-year sentence for his part in the Great Train Robbery. Two years later he fled to Brazil and remained on the run until 2001, when he returned to the UK.

Execution site
Wandsworth was the site of 135 executions, between 1878 and 1961. Built in 1878, the gallows was located near the A wing. In 1911 a new gallows was built between the E and F wings, and in 1938 a new facility was built at the E wing. Among those executed by hanging were:

(in execution-year order)

George Henry Lamson (1852–1882)
George Chapman (1865–1903)
Alfred Edward Stratton (1882–1905)
Albert Ernest Stratton (1884–1905)
Joseph O'Sullivan (1897–1922)
Reginald Dunne (1898–1922)
Jean-Pierre Vaquier (1879–1924)
Patrick Mahon (1890–1924)
Norman Thorne (1902–1925)
Del Fontaine (1904–1935)
George Johnson Armstrong (1902–1941)
Karel Richard Richter (1912–1941)
Gordon Cummins (1914–1942)
Duncan Scott-Ford (1921–1942)
August Sangret (1913–1943)
John Amery (1912–1945)
William Joyce (Lord Haw-Haw) (1906–1946)
John George Haigh (1909–1949)
Derek Bentley (1933–1953)
Alfred Charles Whiteway (executed 22 December 1953)
Guenther Podola (1929–1959)
Francis Forsyth (1942–1960)

On 25 April 1951, a double execution took place at Wandsworth, when Edward Smith and Joseph Brown stood on the gallows together and were executed simultaneously. The final executions at Wandsworth were those of Francis Forsyth on 10 November 1960, Victor John Terry on 25 May 1961 and Henryk Niemasz on 8 September 1961 (Forsyth was one of just four 18-year-olds executed in a British prison in the twentieth century).

With the exceptions of Scott-Ford, who was convicted of treachery, and Joyce and Amery, who were convicted of treason, all executions were for the crime of murder. The gallows were kept in full working order until 1993 and tested every six months. In 1994, they were dismantled and the condemned suite is now used as a tea room for the prison officers.

The gallows' trapdoor and lever were sent to the Prison Service Museum in Rugby, Warwickshire. After this museum permanently closed in 2004, they were sent to the Galleries of Justice in Nottingham, where those and an execution box may be seen.

Recent history

In October 2009, gross misconduct charges were brought against managers of Wandsworth Prison, after an investigation found that prisoners had been temporarily transferred to HMP Pentonville before inspections. The transfers, which included vulnerable prisoners, were made in order to manipulate prison population figures.

In March 2011, an unannounced follow-up inspection was conducted by the Chief Inspector of Prisons, which found that "...Wandsworth compared badly with similar prisons facing similar challenges and we were concerned by what appeared to be unwillingness among some prison managers and staff to acknowledge and take responsibility for the problems the prison faced."

In May 2015 a prisoner was found dead in his cell, prompting a murder investigation.

The prison today

Wandsworth Prison contains eight wings on two units. The smaller unit, containing three wings, was originally designed for women. This unit will focus and house prisoners who attended full time activities.

Education and training courses are offered at Wandsworth. Facilities at the prison include two gyms and a sports hall. The large prison chaplaincy offers chaplains from the Roman Catholic, Anglican, Methodist, Muslim, Jewish, Sikh, Hindu, Buddhist, Mormon and Jehovah's Witness faiths.

A BBC investigation showed large scale drug abuse and cannabis openly being smoked and harder drugs found. There are allegations of staff corruption, even of staff bringing drugs into the prison. Wandsworth has lost its status as a reform prison. Glyn Travis of the Prison Officers Association said, "Wandsworth staff had bought into the reform process and worked well with the governor to implement the reforms. Now, the prison has lost its reform status and once again, staff and prisoners have been left high and dry as this government's agenda seems to change at the drop of a hat." Wandsworth is the most overcrowded prison in England and body scanners were not used on visitors to prevent contraband being brought into the prison, allegedly due to shortage of staff. Peter Clarke said, "In essence, there were too many prisoners, many with drug-related or mental health issues, and with not enough to do." Also, not all staff carried anti-ligature knives despite six suicides since 2015.

Chris Atkins' book A Bit of a Stretch: The Diaries of a Prisoner describes ongoing poor conditions during his stay in 2016–2017 with many of the touted improvements merely being described on paper rather than in existence in the prison. He describes some of the changes that were attempted as part of the "Prison and Safety Reform (2016)" that were not successful.

Notable inmates
 Bat Khurts, head of Mongolia's counter-terrorism agency, 2010.
 Boris Becker, German tennis player, convicted on four charges under the UK's Insolvency Act 2022
 Bruce Reynolds, the man who organised the Great Train Robbery. He spent time in Wandsworth for breaking and entering, assault and also robbery.
 Charles Bronson, notorious long-term inmate and artist.
 Chris Atkins, journalist and documentary maker jailed for fraud. Upon his release, Atkins published a book about his time in Wandsworth.
 Chris Huhne, former Energy Secretary jailed for perverting the course of justice in relation to swapping fixed penalty points with his then wife, Vicky Pryce.
 Christopher Tappin, businessman convicted in the US for selling weapons parts to Iran in violation of international sanctions and jailed 33 months in January 2013; transferred from FCI Allenwood, Pennsylvania to serve his remaining 14-month sentence at Wandsworth in September 2013.
 David Chaytor, first MP to be convicted for his part in the United Kingdom Parliamentary expenses scandal.
 Derek Bentley, convicted of the murder of a policeman and hanged at Wandsworth in 1953, later posthumously pardoned in 1993 and had his murder conviction overturned in 1998.
 Digga D, drill musician from West London convicted for inciting of violence and breaches of a criminal behaviour order. Digga has served multiple sentences at Wandsworth.
 Eric Chappelow, World War I conscientious objector, for four months in 1916.
 Gary Glitter, singer, songwriter, and convicted sex offender.
 Graham Rix, former footballer and coach who was jailed for having underage sex with a 15-year-old girl.
 Ike Ekweremadu, Nigerian politician and former Senator of Nigeria accused of bringing a 21-year-old man into the UK from Nigeria in an organ-harvesting plot.
 James Earl Ray, assassin of Rev. Dr. Martin Luther King, Jr. Remanded from 8 June to 19 July 1968.
 Julian Assange, was remanded in custody at HMP Wandsworth on 7 December 2010 after being refused bail prior to an extradition hearing at Westminster Magistrates Court. On 16 December 2010, he was released on bail after another appeal.
 Mark Aizlewood, former international footballer who was jailed for fraud in 2018. Aizlewood was later transferred to a prison in Wales.
 Max Clifford, former publicist, convicted of 8 counts of indecent assault, later moved to HM Prison Littlehey in June 2014.
 Mazhar Majeed, cricket agent convicted for his part in the Pakistan cricket spot-fixing controversy.
 Mohammad Asif, cricketer convicted for his part in the Pakistan cricket spot-fixing controversy.
 Nirav Modi, fugitive diamond merchant, a principal in the Punjab National Bank Scam, who fled to the UK from India.
 Oscar Wilde, writer.
 Pete Doherty, musician.
 Roger Hallam, Co-founder of Extinction Rebellion and climate movement activist, on remand for  ‘Conspiracy to Commit a Public Nuisance’.
 Rolf Harris, Australian-born artist and entertainer, convicted for twelve counts of indecent assault, and it was reported that he never turned up at Wandsworth but instead moved to HM Prison Bullingdon.
 Ronnie Biggs, participant in the Great Train Robbery, who escaped from the prison in 1965 before fleeing the country.
 Ronnie Kray, organised crime leader.
 Salman Butt, cricketer convicted for his part in the Pakistan cricket spot-fixing controversy.
 Tom O'Carroll, pro-paedophile activist and convicted sex offender, imprisoned in the early 1980s for conspiracy to corrupt public morals.

In popular culture

Wandsworth is mentioned in multiple forms of media.

Film
Starred Up (2014) was written by a former therapist at this prison.
Let Him Have It (1991) features Derek Bentley, who was held in this prison up until he was hanged in 1953.
A Clockwork Orange (1971) shows the exterior of the prison (the interiors were filmed elsewhere).

Literature
In Anthony Burgess' novel A Clockwork Orange (1962), the character Alex is imprisoned at Wandsworth.
Graham Greene visited Wandsworth and used it as the model for the prison in which the hero awaits execution in the novel It's a Battlefield (1934).
In the novel Atonement (2001), by Ian McEwan, the character Robbie Turner is imprisoned in Wandsworth for over four years.
The prison is mentioned toward the end of the novel Down and Out in Paris and London (1933), by George Orwell.
Will Self's short story "The Nonce Prize", in his short fiction collection Tough, Tough Toys for Tough, Tough Boys (1998), is set in and around the prison.

Music
Wandsworth is mentioned in:
 "The Battle of Epping Forest", a song from the Genesis album Selling England by the Pound (1973)
"Let Him Dangle", a song from the Elvis Costello album Spike (1989)
"Switch", a song by Senser
"Cool for Cats" (1979), a song by Squeeze
"Wandsworth to Bullingdon" (2021), a song by Fredo and Headie One

References

External links

Ministry of Justice pages on Wandsworth
Victorian Prisoners' Photograph Albums from Wandsworth prison on The National Archives' website.

1851 establishments in England
Prisons in London
Men's prisons
Category B prisons in England
Category C prisons in England
Execution sites in England
Buildings and structures in the London Borough of Wandsworth